Khab is a village in Himachal Pradesh, India

Khab or variant, may also refer to:

 Marion County – Rankin Fite Airport (ICAO airport code  KHAB ), Marion County, Alabama, USA
 KhabAvia, a Russian airline based out of Khabarovsk
 Khab (康), a sub-clan of Miao; see Hmong customs and culture
 "KhAB-", Russian aerial bomb prefix
 KhAB-250
 KhAB-500

See also

 
 KAB (disambiguation)